The Gisborne Herald is the daily evening newspaper for Gisborne and environs. It is one of only four independently owned daily newspapers in New Zealand.

History
Established in 1874 as the Poverty Bay Herald it was published biweekly in the morning by Carlile and Co. In 1877 it was taken over by Poverty Bay Printing and Publishing Co., who turned it into an evening paper. In June 1875, publishing began tri-weekly, and changed again in October 1878 to become a daily paper. The Poverty Bay Herald Co. Ltd. (now the Gisborne Herald Co. Ltd.) was formed in 1908. The paper was renamed The Gisborne Herald in 1939.

In 1999 it changed from a broadsheet to a tabloid format, making it New Zealand's only daily tabloid newspaper.

References

External links

Newspapers published in New Zealand
Gisborne District
Mass media in Gisborne, New Zealand
Publications established in 1874
1874 establishments in New Zealand